Pondosa is an unincorporated community in Siskiyou County, California, United States. A post office opened in Pondosa in 1925. The community was named after the ponderosa pine by Elmer E. Hall.

References

Further reading 

 

Unincorporated communities in California
Unincorporated communities in Siskiyou County, California